Ocnogyna advena is a moth of the family Erebidae. It was described by Johan Christian Fabricius in 1787. It is found in North Africa.

References

Spilosomina
Moths described in 1787